The Erdemli Sports Hall is a multi-sport indoor arena located at Erdemli district of Mersin Province, Turkey. Built in 1979, it is owned by the Youth Services and Sports Directoriate of Mersin. The sports hall has a seating capacity of 750, and hosts basketball, volleyball, gymnastics and some other sports events.

The venue hosted the weightlifting events of the 2013 Mediterranean Games on June 21–26.

References

Sports venues in Mersin
Sports venues completed in 1979
Indoor arenas in Turkey
Basketball venues in Turkey
Volleyball venues in Turkey
2013 Mediterranean Games venues
Erdemli District
1979 establishments in Turkey